Conwy railway station serves the town of Conwy, Wales, and is located on the Crewe to Holyhead North Wales Coast Line. There are through services to Chester via Colwyn Bay, Rhyl, Prestatyn and Flint in one direction and to Bangor & Holyhead in the other. After arrival at Chester, most trains go forward to either Crewe, Cardiff or Birmingham International.

History
The station was opened by the Chester and Holyhead Railway on 1 May 1848; it was closed as part of the Beeching cuts on 14 February 1966 but reopened on 29 June 1987 as a request stop. Upon reopening, the Welsh spelling Conwy was adopted, in contrast to the Anglicised form Conway used until closure in 1966.

The original station had substantial decorated mock-Tudor style buildings on both sides (being sited within the town walls), along with canopies and a footbridge - this was however demolished soon after closure and no trace now remains.  The modern 1987 replacement has only basic amenities, no ticket office and shorter platforms.

From 6 July 2020, trains did not call at the station due to the short platform and the inability to maintain social distancing between passengers and the guard when opening the train door. A limited service had returned by 29 March 2021.

Facilities
The station platforms can only fully accommodate 2 coaches. Services operated by longer DMUs that call at this station do so under 'local door operation', whereby passengers may only board or alight through one door of the train, usually the leading door of the second coach. This avoids obvious safety risks presented by passengers alighting from doors that are not adjacent to the platform. Each platform has an open sided shelter for waiting passengers, a customer help point, timetable poster boards and digital CIS displays.  There is no ticketing provision and the station is unmanned - tickets must be bought on the train or in advance of travel.  Step-free access is available (via ramps) to both sides.

Services

There is a basic two-hourly service each way Monday to Saturday, improving to hourly at certain times (morning peak and late afternoon/early evening). The Sunday service is infrequent (particularly in winter), with large gaps between trains.

Gallery

References

Further reading

External links

Railway stations in Conwy County Borough
DfT Category F2 stations
Former London and North Western Railway stations
Railway stations in Great Britain opened in 1848
Railway stations in Great Britain closed in 1966
Railway stations in Great Britain opened in 1987
Reopened railway stations in Great Britain
Railway stations served by Transport for Wales Rail
Railway request stops in Great Britain
Buildings and structures in Conwy
Beeching closures in Wales